P2F, also known as P2F model or P2F finance, is a concept of Internet finance with full name of person-to-financial institution products. The term refers to the mode in which individuals connect with the products of financial institutions and quasi-financial institutions through the Internet.

In the term "P2F", "P" stands for "peer", and "F" stands for "financial institution" or "financial asset". P2F is gradually derived from the P2P model. The representatives of P2F are Beevault, and Yu'ebao (余额宝).

Definition
P2F is a term of "Internet finance", which was coined in 2012 by Ping Xie and Chuanwei Zou. P2F is a model in which individuals connect with the products of the financial institution and quasi-financial institution via the Internet.

P2F is an upgraded version of P2P. Compared with P2P, financing objects of P2F are financial institutions and quasi-financial institution.

References

Collaborative finance
Financial technology